Dendropsophus arndti is a species of "clown tree frogs" described in 2017 that lives in the Amazon basin of Bolivia. The specific name arndti honors professor Rudolf G. Arndt, in recognition of his financial support for research and nature conservation.

Distribution
This species is endemic to the Amazon basin of Bolivia in the Beni and Santa Cruz Departments.

Description
Adult males measure  and adult females, based on a single specimen,  in snout–vent length. The head is broader than it is long. The snout is short and rounded in dorsal view, truncate in profile. The eyes are large and protuberant. The tympanum is concealed beneath skin, but the tympanic annulus is visible below skin. The supratympanic fold is faint but concealing the tympanic annulus dorsally. The fingers and toes are partially webbed and bear large discs (smaller on the toes than on the fingers). Skin is smooth. Coloration is variable. Most specimens have clear dorsolateral bands, but some have a reticulated dorsal pattern. The background color is dark brown to brown, and the bands, spots, and reticulations are white to bright yellow.

Habitat and conservation

This newly described species is not yet included in the IUCN Red List of Threatened Species, but Caminer and colleagues suggest that it should be considered of "least concern" because of its relatively wide distribution and a low proportion of degraded habitat.

References

arndti
Endemic fauna of Bolivia
Amphibians of Bolivia
Amphibians described in 2017